Catherine "Kay" Maguire (later Horsfall, February 4, 1906 – April 1991) was an American track and field athlete who competed in the 1928 Summer Olympics, finishing eighth in the women's high jump event.

She was born in Pacific, Missouri.

External links

American female high jumpers
Olympic track and field athletes of the United States
Athletes (track and field) at the 1928 Summer Olympics
1906 births
1991 deaths
20th-century American women
20th-century American people